Eugenie Bouchard was the defending champion, having won the event in 2012, but she chose not to defend her title.

Risa Ozaki won the tournament, defeating Samantha Murray in the final, 0–6, 7–5, 6–2.

Seeds

Main draw

Finals

Top half

Bottom half

References 
 Main draw

Challenger Banque Nationale de Granby
Challenger de Granby